For Someone I Love is an album by vibraphonist Milt Jackson featuring big band performances arranged by Melba Liston recorded in 1963 and released on the Riverside label.

Reception
The Allmusic review by Scott Yanow awarded the album 3 stars stating "The well-conceived set is consistently excellent, making this a highly recommended set".

Track listing
All compositions by Milt Jackson except where noted.
 "Days of Wine and Roses" (Henry Mancini, Johnny Mercer) - 4:25 
 "For Someone I Love (What's Your Story)" - 6:04 
 "(What's Your Story) Morning Glory" (Jack Lawrence, Paul Francis Webster, Mary Lou Williams) - 3:41 
 "Save Your Love for Me" (Buddy Johnson) - 4:21 
 "Extraordinary Blues" - 4:15 
 "Flamingo" (Ted Grouya, Edmund Anderson) - 4:24 
 "Chelsea Bridge" (Billy Strayhorn) - 4:49 
 "Just Waiting" (Melba Liston) - 3:30 
 "Bossa Bags" - 2:52 
Recorded in New York City on March 18, 1963 (tracks 4-6 & 9) and August 5, 1963 (tracks 1-3, 7 & 8)

Personnel
Milt Jackson – vibes
Bill Berry (tracks 1-3, 7 & 8), Dave Burns, Thad Jones (tracks 4-6 & 9), Clark Terry, Elmon Wright (tracks 1-3, 7 & 8), Snooky Young - trumpet
Jimmy Cleveland, Quentin Jackson, Tom McIntosh (tracks 4-6 & 9), John Rains (tracks 4-6 & 9), Willie Ruff (tracks 1-3, 7 & 8) - trombone
Ray Alonge, Paul Ingraham (tracks 1-3, 7 & 8), Bob Northern (tracks 4-6 & 9), Julius Watkins - French horn
Major Holley - tuba
Hank Jones (tracks 4-6 & 9), Jimmy Jones (tracks 1-3, 7 & 8) - piano
Richard Davis - bass
Connie Kay (tracks 1-3, 7 & 8), Charlie Persip (tracks 4-6 & 9) - drums
Melba Liston - arranger, conductor

References 

Riverside Records albums
Milt Jackson albums
1963 albums
Albums produced by Orrin Keepnews
Albums arranged by Melba Liston